Jouni Rinne (born 12 March 1956) is a retired professional ice hockey player who played in the SM-liiga.  He played for Lukko, HPK, KalPa, KooKoo, and YJK.  He was inducted into the Finnish Hockey Hall of Fame in 2005.

Rinne is the only Finnish player ever to be drafted by California Seals.

External links 

 Finnish Hockey Hall of Fame bio 

Finnish ice hockey forwards
HPK players
Lukko players
KooKoo players
California Golden Seals draft picks
Phoenix Roadrunners draft picks
1956 births
Living people
Ice hockey players with retired numbers
People from Rauma, Finland
Sportspeople from Satakunta